The men's bantamweight (54 kg/118.8 lbs) Full-Contact category at the W.A.K.O. European Championships 2004 in Budva was the second lightest of the male Full-Contact tournaments, involving just four fighters.  Each of the matches was three rounds of two minutes each and were fought under Full-Contact kickboxing rules.

By the end of the championship Zurab Faroyan from Russia won the gold medal against Pole Tomasz Makowski by unanimous decision after three rounds.  Gabor Aburko from Hungary and Filip Exsan from Bulgaria won bronze medals.

Results

Key

See also
List of WAKO Amateur European Championships
List of WAKO Amateur World Championships
List of male kickboxers

References

External links
 WAKO World Association of Kickboxing Organizations Official Site

W.A.K.O. European Championships 2004 (Budva)